Mike de Jong,  (born 1963) is a provincial politician and was cabinet minister of the Legislative Assembly of British Columbia. He represents the electoral district of Abbotsford as a member of the British Columbia Liberal Party.

Early life 
De Jong was born to Dutch parents who immigrated to Canada after Canadian soldiers liberated the Netherlands in World War II. At age eight, he and his family moved to a farm in the District of Matsqui in British Columbia. He attended Abbotsford's last single-room elementary school and worked as farm labourer as an early teen.

He holds a Bachelor of Arts degree from Carleton University in Ottawa and a law degree from the University of Alberta.

After graduating from law school, De Jong returned to Matsqui to set up a law practice and was elected at age 26 as one of Canada's youngest school board members.

Provincial politics 
In 1994, De Jong was recruited by Gordon Campbell of the British Columbia Liberal Party to compete against new Social Credit Party leader Grace McCarthy in a byelection in Matsqui.

The Socreds had represented the riding for 42 years until De Jong defeated McCarthy by a margin of 42 votes.

McCarthy had been attempting to rebuild the province's governing political party.  Shortly after the loss, McCarthy resigned as Social Credit Party leader, and the party failed to elect any members in the subsequent provincial election in 1996.

De Jong was re-elected in the 1996, 2001, and 2005 elections in the new riding of Abbotsford-Mount Lehman, and in the newly created riding of Abbotsford West in the 2009 election.

De Jong was a member of the Official Opposition between 1994 and 2001. In the Liberal government, he served as government house leader

On December 1, 2010, Mike de Jong announced that he would seek the leadership of the BC Liberal Party, in the February 26, 2011 leadership election. He placed fourth in the leadership election, which was won by Christy Clark.

In 2012, Mike de Jong's Ministry of Health fired seven health ministry workers without cause, Margaret MacDiarmid as his freshly appointed replacement falsely claimed that the RCMP were investigating their misbehavior.

Later, after one worker committed suicide, others sued, none were charged, some got cash settlements and their jobs back, and the premier apologized, it came to light that the RCMP, for lack of evidence, had never launched any investigation at all. The case was reviewed by the BC ombudsperson's, who issued many recommendations citing the impropriety of actions taken by De Jong and his successor. Among these recommendations was that the government of British Columbia endows a scholarship in the memory of the worker who committed suicide as a result of these improprieties.

He was appointed minister of finance on September 5, 2012. He previously held the posts of Minister of Health, attorney general, Labour and Citizen Services, Forests, Public Safety, and Aboriginal Relations and Reconciliation.

Controversy 
As an Opposition Critic, De Jong was regarded as very vocal. He was ejected from the legislative assembly for calling then-Attorney General Colin Gableman a "liar" and was later sued for libel by federal cabinet minister Herb Dhaliwal.

In 2004, as Minister of Forests, De Jong removed 70,000 hectares of land from TFL 44 with no compensation from the owner and against the recommendations of ministry staff. This effectively privatized what had been Crown Land without compensation to the province.  The changes made allowed the wood to be exported as raw logs rather than lumber.  It also allowed for its eventual development.  The land in question was under dispute by the Hupacasath First Nation and also the Tseshaht First Nation. No consultation took place and the bands have since filed legal action.  He has also been linked to other such privatizations of Crown forest land.

In 2010, De Jong faced further controversy when, as attorney general, he approved the payment of $6 million in legal fees for Liberal Party insiders David Basi and Robert Virk who pleaded guilty to charges of breach of trust and accepting benefits in connection with the sale of BC Rail in 2003. De Jong defended his actions saying the government's Legal Services Branch had recommended they not try to collect the funds since the aides did not have any money.

Electoral record

See also 
2011 British Columbia Liberal Party leadership election
British Columbia Liberal Party
BC Legislature Raids

References

External links
Mike de Jong MLA
Mike de Jong

Year of birth missing (living people)
Living people
Attorneys General of British Columbia
British Columbia Liberal Party MLAs
Canadian people of Dutch descent
Carleton University alumni
Finance ministers of British Columbia
Health ministers of British Columbia
Members of the Executive Council of British Columbia
University of Alberta alumni
21st-century Canadian politicians
Solicitors general of Canadian provinces